This is a list of launches made by the R-7 Semyorka ICBM, and its derivatives. All launches are orbital satellite launches, unless stated otherwise.

Due to the size of the list, it has been split into several smaller articles:
 List of R-7 launches (1957–1959)
 List of R-7 launches (1960–1964)
 List of R-7 launches (1965–1969)
 List of R-7 launches (1970–1974)
 List of R-7 launches (1975–1979)
 List of R-7 launches (1980–1984)
 List of R-7 launches (1985–1989)
 List of R-7 launches (1990–1994)
 List of R-7 launches (1995–1999)
 List of R-7 launches (2000–2004)
 List of R-7 launches (2005–2009)
 List of R-7 launches (2010–2014)
 List of R-7 launches (2015–2019)
 List of R-7 launches (2020–2024)

Statistics are up-to-date .

References